Pithavum Kanyakayum (Malayalam: പിതാവും കന്യകയും; literally meaning Father and Virgin), officially titled in English as Daddy, You Bastard, is a 2013 Malayalam film directed by Rupesh Paul and N. K. Sajiv Menon. The story is about a middle-aged man who spends the night with a girl who happens to be his daughter's classmate. Short story writer Indu Menon has written the story while her husband, Rupesh Paul, has written the script and dialogue for the film. The cast include M. G. Sasi, director of the award-winning film Atayalangal, Krupa and Sasi Kalinga. The film premiered in the Marche du Film section of 2010 Cannes Film Festival. It released in theatres on 4 October 2013.

Plot
Balachandran, a middle-aged government servant attempts to be daring for the first time in his life. He does just this; he borrows his friend's flat for a night and decides to spend the night there with his lover. His lover is his daughter's friend Agnes, who is a higher secondary school student. Balachandran is guilt-ridden and fearful but he cannot resist this girl who is attractive to the core. Balachandran is an artist who has lost his libido due to his tumultuous married life; but Agnes is a phenomenon, whom no one can turn down. Agnes keep her word; she comes and she conquers. She brushes aside the weak protestations that Balachandran comes up with and decides to drink and enjoy the night to its full. They prepare for the big moment, and just before a kiss, Agnes whispers her big secret to Balachandran, that she is the last virgin in her class. Balachandran is shocked, his daughter Ammu is in Agnes' class. There, that night, the bouquet of vodka and the perfume of jasmine flowers mingle with that of blood.

Cast
 M. G. Sasi as Balachandran
 Kripa as Agnes
 Sasi Kalinga

References

2010s Malayalam-language films
2013 films
Films directed by Rupesh Paul